Carlos Daniel Tapia (born 20 August 1962 in San Miguel, Buenos Aires) is a retired Argentine footballer who played as an attacking midfielder.

Career
Tapia started playing professional football for Argentine club River Plate in 1981, when then coach Alfredo Di Stéfano named him for the first team, replacing football legend Norberto Alonso.

In 1985, he would move to River's hated rivals Boca Juniors. He was a member of the Argentine squad that won the 1986 World Cup, though he played only a few minutes during the tournament. He replaced Jorge Burruchaga in the match against England and hit the post with his shot. He is one of the two Boca players to win the title, the other being Julio Olarticoechea.

Tapia is the only player in the history of Boca Juniors to have had four distinct spells with the club, in his last spell with Boca he helped them to win the Apertura 1992 championship, their first league title in 11 years and the Copa Oro in 1993. He played a total of 217 games for Boca in all competitions, scoring 46 goals.

Career statistics

Club

Honours

Club
River Plate
 Metropolitano: 1980

Boca Juniors
 Apertura: 1992
 Copa Oro: 1993

International
Argentina
 FIFA World Cup: 1986

References

External links

Carlos Daniel Tapia at BDFA.com.ar 

1962 births
Living people
Sportspeople from Buenos Aires Province
Argentine footballers
Boca Juniors footballers
Stade Brestois 29 players
Deportivo Mandiyú footballers
Expatriate footballers in France
Expatriate footballers in Chile
Expatriate footballers in Switzerland
Argentine expatriate sportspeople in France
Club Atlético River Plate footballers
Universidad de Chile footballers
FC Lugano players
1986 FIFA World Cup players
1987 Copa América players
FIFA World Cup-winning players
Argentina youth international footballers
Argentina under-20 international footballers
Argentina international footballers
Argentine expatriate footballers
Argentine Primera División players
Ligue 1 players
Swiss Super League players
Chilean Primera División players
Association football midfielders